David Colin Sherrington FRS (5 March 1945 – 4 October 2014) was a polymer chemist whose research career was based at the University of Strathclyde.

He also spent three years in industrial chemistry, working at Unilever's Port Sunlight laboratory. He served as Head of the organic chemistry section at the University of Strathclyde from 1992–2005. He was made Fellow of the Royal Society of Chemistry in 1981, and Fellow of the Royal Society in 2007. He served on the board of the journal Reactive Polymers from 1982–2010.

References

1945 births
2014 deaths
Fellows of the Royal Society
Polymer scientists and engineers